The following is the 1983–84 network television schedule for the three major English language commercial broadcast networks in the United States. The schedule covers primetime hours from September 1983 through August 1984. The schedule is followed by a list per network of returning series, new series, and series cancelled after the 1982–83 season. All times are Eastern and Pacific, with certain exceptions, such as Monday Night Football.

New series are highlighted in bold.

Each of the 30 highest-rated shows is listed with its rank and rating as determined by Nielsen Media Research.

Legend

PBS is not included; member stations have local flexibility over most of their schedules and broadcast times for network shows may vary.

 Sunday  

 Monday  

 Tuesday  

 Wednesday  

 Thursday  

 Friday  

 Saturday  

Note: Starting January 7, 1984, Whiz Kids replaced Cutter to Houston at 8:00/7:00 CST due to the latters cancellation. After airing the two-hour pilot episode of Airwolf on January 22, 1984, following Super Bowl XVIII, CBS ran Airwolf in its first season at 9:00 EST/8:00 CST Saturdays starting with the episode "Daddy's Gone A Hunt'n" on January 28, 1984. Mickey Spillane's Mike Hammer starring Stacy Keach as Mike Hammer also premiered on CBS on January 28, 1984, at 10:00 EST/9:00 CST. On NBC, Bosom Buddies consisted of reruns of the 1980–1982 series.

By network

ABC

Returning Series20/20The ABC Sunday Night MovieABC NFL Monday Night Football9 to 5BensonDynastyThe Fall GuyFantasy IslandHappy DaysHart to HartLife's Most Embarrassing MomentsThe Love BoatMatt HoustonMonday Night BaseballRipley's Believe It or Not!T. J. HookerThat's Incredible!Three's CompanyNew Seriesa.k.a. Pablo *Automan *Blue Thunder *Foul-Ups, Bleeps & Blunders *Hardcastle and McCormickHotelIt's Not EasyJust Our LuckLottery!Masquerade *Oh MadelineShaping Up *Trauma CenterTwo MarriagesWebsterNot returning from 1982–83:Amanda'sAt EaseBaby Makes FiveCondoThe Greatest American HeroHigh PerformanceIt Takes TwoLaverne & ShirleyThe New Odd CoupleThe QuestThe RenegadesRyan's FourStar of the FamilyTales of the Gold MonkeyToo Close for Comfort ^

CBS

Returning Series60 MinutesAliceCagney & Lacey *DallasThe Dukes of HazzardFalcon CrestGoodnight, BeantownThe JeffersonsKnots LandingMagnum, P.I.The MississippiNewhartOne Day at a TimeRosieSimon & SimonTrapper John, M.D.New SeriesAirwolf *The American Parade *AfterMASHCutter to HoustonDomestic Life *Emerald Point N.A.S.Empire *The Four Seasons *Kate & Allie *Maggie BriggsMama Malone *Mickey Spillane's Mike Hammer *Scarecrow and Mrs. KingWhiz KidsNot returning from 1982–83:Ace Crawford, Private EyeArchie Bunker's PlaceBring 'Em Back AliveFilthy RichFoot in the DoorGloriaGun ShyM*A*S*HPrivate BenjaminSeven Brides for Seven BrothersSmall & FryeSquare PegsTucker's WitchWalt DisneyWizards and WarriorsZorro and SonNBC

Returning SeriesThe A-TeamBuffalo Bill *CheersDiff'rent StrokesThe Facts of LifeFamily TiesGimme a Break!Hill Street BluesKnight RiderMama's FamilyNBC Monday Night at the MoviesReal PeopleRemington SteeleSt. ElsewhereSilver SpoonsNew SeriesBay City BluesBooneComedy Zone *Double Trouble *The Duck Factory *First CameraFor Love and HonorJennifer Slept HereLegmen *ManimalThe Master *Mr. SmithThe New Show *Night Court *People Are Funny *Riptide *The RoustersSummer Sunday U.S.A. *TV's Bloopers & Practical Jokes *We Got It MadeThe Yellow RoseNot returning from 1982–83:Bare EssenceCHiPsThe Devlin ConnectionFame ^The Family TreeFather MurphyGavilanLittle House: A New BeginningLove, SidneyMonitorThe News is the NewsThe Powers of Matthew StarQuincy, M.E.TaxiTeachers OnlyVoyagers!''

Note: The * indicates that the program was introduced in midseason. An ^ indicates a show that came back in first-run syndication after a network cancellation.

References

United States primetime network television schedules
1983 in American television
1984 in American television